The 1932 Tennessee Volunteers football team (variously "Tennessee", "UT" or the "Vols") represented the University of Tennessee in the 1932 Southern Conference football season. Playing as a member of the Southern Conference (SoCon), the team was led by head coach Robert Neyland, in his seventh year, and played their home games at Shields–Watkins Field in Knoxville, Tennessee.

The 1932 Vols won nine, lost zero and tied one game (9–0–1 overall, 7–0–1 in the SoCon) and were Southern Conference champions.  It was their last year in the conference before moving to the newly formed Southeastern Conference. The team was led by its backfield with Deke Brackett and Beattie Feathers.

Schedule

Season summary

Chattanooga
In the season opener, the Vols defeated Chattanooga  13–0.

Ole Miss
In the second week of play, Tennessee beat Ole Miss 33–0.

North Carolina
The Volunteers defeated the Tar Heels 20–7.

Alabama

Source:

Against rival Alabama, the Vols won 7–3 at Legion Field in rainy conditions. Alabama scored its only points of the game when Hillman Holley connected on a 12-yard field goal in the second quarter to take a 3–0 lead. Alabama held their lead through the fourth quarter when Johnny Cain had a punt of only 12-yards from his own endzone to give Tennessee the ball at the 12-yard line. Three plays later, Beattie Feathers scored on a seven-yard touchdown run and with the extra point, the Volunteers took a 7–3 lead that they would not relinquish. Due to the poor weather conditions, the game was noted for both Alabama head coach Thomas and Tennessee head coach Robert Neyland calling for punt after punt, often on first and second down, in an attempt to gain field position advantage. As a result, Feathers punted 21 times for Tennessee, and Cain punted 19 times for Alabama. Cain's 19 punts and 914 total yards still stand as the single game school records for punts and punting yardage.

Maryville
Maryville was swamped 60–0.

Duke

Source:

In a game deemed a "thriller", the Vols beat Wallace Wade's Duke Blue Devils 16–13. Feathers ran through Duke's line time and again. The highlight of the contest came when Fred Crawford intercepted a pass and raced 72 yards for a touchdown. Wynn kicked Tennessee's winning field goal.

The starting lineup was Rayburn (left end), Franklin (left tackle), Ellis (left guard), Maples (center), Frank (right guard), Aitken (right tackle), Warmath (right end), Robinson (quarterback), Vaughn (left halfback), Feathers (right halfback), Middletown (fullback).

Mississippi State
Mississippi State was beaten 31–0.

Vanderbilt

Source:

Clyde Roberts and Vanderbilt fought the Vols to a scoreless tie. The game's only score was called back in the second half. Feathers caught a pass but was called out of bounds at the 27-yard line, right in front of the Vanderbilt bench.

Kentucky
The Volunteers beat the Wildcats of Kentucky 26–0.

Florida

Source:

The Vols defeated Charlie Bachman's Florida Gators 32–13. Beattie Feathers scored after the opening kickoff.

Players

Line

Backfield

References

Tennessee
Tennessee Volunteers football seasons
Southern Conference football champion seasons
College football undefeated seasons
Tennessee Volunteers football